The Arrows A2 was a Formula One racing car, designed by Tony Southgate and Dave Wass, was used by the Arrows team in the latter half of the 1979 Formula One season. Powered by a Cosworth DFV V8 engine and driven by Riccardo Patrese and Jochen Mass, it was relatively unsuccessful with its best finish being sixth on two occasions.

Design and development
For the  season, Tony Southgate supervised the design and development of the Arrows A2. Unlike most contemporary cars, the engine, a Cosworth DFV V8 engine, and gearbox of the A2 were set at a four-degree angled incline. This enabled the use of aerodynamic underfloor sections across the full width of the chassis. This had the effect of raising the car's centre of gravity. The A2 generated extensive downforce, but at the expense of handling. Within weeks design work started on the A2's successor, the A3, and the previous year's car, the A1, was brought back for one final entry in the 1979 season.

Race history
The A2 made its debut at the 1979 French Grand Prix but finished well down the field. Mass managed a pair of sixth places, at the German and Dutch Grands Prix.

Complete Formula One World Championship results
(key) 

 3 points scored using the A1B.

Notes

References

A02